Como É Que Se Diz Eu te Amo is the second live album by Brazilian rock band Legião Urbana, released in 2001. It is the fourth posthumous album by the band after Renato Russo's death in 1996.

It was recorded in Rio de Janeiro, in the former Metropolitan music theater (now called KM de Vantagens Hall) on October 8 and 9, 1994, as part of their O Descobrimento do Brasil promotional tour.

Background 
Pirate recordings of the shows were already circulating among fans, which was an additional reason for EMI to release the project. But the album only began to be prepared when journalist Marcelo Froés found the original tapes.

Fóes had been assigned by vocalist, acoustic guitarist and keyboardist Renato Russo's father to investigate his solo and band musical collection. The other members, Dado Villa-Lobos (guitar) and Marcelo Bonfá (drums), also supported his work. By the end of his research, Fróes gathered 83 CD-Rs. Villa-Lobos and Bonfá gave him some additional tapes they had at home and he ended up possessing over 100 copies.

As the compilation was under production, Herbert Vianna, vocalist and guitarist of Os Paralamas do Sucesso, suffered the accident that cost the life of his wife, Lucy Needham Vianna, and also his legs' motor functions. The album was subsequently dedicated to Lucy.

Track listing
Disc 1

Disc 2

 The song is actually titled "O Bêbado e a Equilibrista", indicating that the equilibrist is a female.

Personnel 
Per source:

Band 
 Renato Russo - lead vocals
 Dado Villa-Lobos - guitar
 Marcelo Bonfá - drums and percussion

Supporting musicians 
 Fred Nascimento - electric & acoustic guitar
 Gian Fabra - bass guitar
 Carlos Trilha - keyboards

References and notes

 

Legião Urbana albums
2001 live albums